Women's Polytechnic, Kolkata is a girls polytechnic college located in Gariahat Road (South) Jodhpur Park in Kolkata, West Bengal.

About college
This polytechnic is affiliated with the West Bengal State Council of Technical Education  and recognised by AICTE, New Delhi. This polytechnic offers diploma courses in Electronics & Telecommunication
Engineering, Architecture, Computer Science & Technology, Modern Office Practice & Management, and 3D Animation & Graphics.

See also

References

External links
 Admission to Polytechnics in West Bengal for Academic Session 2006-2007
College Website: http://womenspolytechnickolkata.in/
Official website WBSCTE

Universities and colleges in Kolkata
Technical universities and colleges in West Bengal
Educational institutions in India with year of establishment missing